Freystrop is a village, parish and community in Pembrokeshire, Wales,  southeast of Haverfordwest.

References

External links

 Further historical information and sources on GENUKI

Villages in Pembrokeshire
Communities in Pembrokeshire